Carex rorulenta is a species of true sedge in the family Cyperaceae, endemic to the Balearic Islands of Spain. A common species, it is a hexaploid with some chromosomal irregularities.

References

rorulenta
Endemic flora of Spain
Flora of the Balearic Islands
Plants described in 1887